The Coalition on Psychiatric Emergencies (CPE) is a collaborative working group of behavioral health, psychiatry, and emergency medicine professionals headed by the American College of Emergency Physicians. COPE represents severalprofessional organizations, making it a large collaborative in the field of emergency psychiatry in the United States.

History
According to CPE's website, the coalition came out of a "psychiatric emergency summit" in December 2014.

Activities
CPE hosted its "1st Annual Research Consensus Conference on Acute Mental Illness" on December 7–9, 2016 in Las Vegas, NV.

Formation
The coalition's member organizations represent multiple healthcare disciplines, including emergency physicians, nurses, pharmacists, and other stakeholders. CPE is composed of the following member organizations:
American Academy of Emergency Medicine
American Association for Emergency Psychiatry
American College of Emergency Physicians
Depression and Bipolar Support Alliance
Emergency Nurse Association
National Alliance on Mental Illness
National Council on Behavioral Health

CPE past supporters (but not representative members) include Teva Pharmaceutical Industries, New Directions and Alexza Pharmaceuticals.

Reception
The formation of CPE has been widely reported in the medical media.

Praise
Scott Zeller, MD, Chief of Psychiatric Emergency Services for the Alameda Health System, has described the collaborative as "unprecedented." Peggy DeCarlis, chief operating and innovation officer of New Directions Behavioral Health, has expressed "excitement" towards her organization's partnership with CPE.

Criticism
David W. Covington, LPC, MBA, CEO and president of RI International, an international provider of recovery services, has suggested that the "reinforcements" that CPE will bring to American emergency departments are not enough to combat the problems that emergency departments face in dealing with acute psychiatric emergencies.

References

External links 

 Official website

Emergency medical services in the United States
Emergency medicine and EMS task force articles
Emergency medicine organisations
Psychiatric specialities
Mental health organizations in Texas
Neuroscience conferences
Charities based in Texas